The Featured Artists Coalition (FAC) is a UK-based nonprofit organisation for featured musical artists.

The organisation was founded  by a number of artists in early 2009. It lobbies and campaigns for the rights of featured artists (i.e. 'the musicians and bands whose names are on the cover of the record' as distinct from session musicians), highlighting issues such as the relations between major content providers and record labels, copyright term extension, and anti piracy measures. It encourages a greater connection between fans and artists and aims to promote transparency in the music industry.

History 
The FAC was launched at Heaven on 11 March 2009. On 24 September 2009, an open meeting for featured artists was held at Air Studios. The inaugural Artist and Manager Awards was held in conjunction with the MMF at the Roundhouse in London's Chalk Farm on 13 September 2011, at which Ed Sheeran and Mumford & Sons performed. Massive Attack won the Artists’ Artist Award, Ed Sheeran won the Award for Breakthrough Artist and Everybody's Management and its artists won the Achievement Award, the highest accolade of the night.

The Artist and Manager Awards 2012 was held at the Troxy on 27 November 2013. Winners included Amanda Palmer for Industry Pioneer and Zane Lowe for Industry Champion. Artist awards were given to Madeon and Plan B and Ben Howard's manager, Owain Davies, was awarded the Breakthrough Manager award.

Spotify sponsored the event and awarded a ten thousand pound grant to a promising artist and manager partnership. The winners were manager Danny Blackman and act, Pale Seas.

Artist & Manager Awards 
The FAC has partnered with Music Managers Forum to organize an annual ceremony, the Artist & Manager Awards, "to celebrate the achievements of a whole spectrum of artists and managers". Music funding platform, beatBread, was the headline sponsor of the 2022 awards.

Notable campaigns 
The FAC has worked in concert with the British Academy of Songwriters, Composers and Authors and the Music Producers Guild in campaigns to protect rights of performers and musicians and for "artists to have more control of their music and a much fairer share of the profits".

References

External links

Music organisations based in the United Kingdom